Judge Lucas may refer to:

John Baptiste Charles Lucas (1758–1842), judge of the Pennsylvania Court of Common Pleas and judge of the United States District Court for the District of Louisiana
Malcolm Lucas (1927–2016), judge of the United States District Court for the Central District of California before serving as Chief Justice of California

See also
Justice Lucas (disambiguation)